Griro Tower is an office building located in Bucharest. It has 15 floors and a surface of 10,000 m2.

External links

Skyscraper office buildings in Bucharest
Office buildings completed in 1984